Lê Văn Tống (September 1, 1946 – April 5, 2019), known as Lý Tống, was a Vietnamese American anti-communist terrorist.

Early life
Ly Tong was born on September 1, 1946, to a family of 9 brothers. His father Le Van Tan was a member of the Communist Party of Vietnam, was arrested by the French Army in Huế and died during imprisonment. Tan was honored as one of the heroic martyrs by the Vietnamese government. Ly Tong's brother Le Van Quy joined the CPV in 1949, and in 1984 worked as an assistant professor and served as the head of the Faculty of Literature at the Ho Chi Minh City University of Social Sciences and Humanities.

Talking about his family, Ly Tong said: 
 "My father was against the French, my brother was against the US, and I was against the Communist. That is Ly Tong's life."

In the early years of his life, he studied at An Cựu Primary School in South Vietnam, and then transferred to Nguyen Tri Phuong High School. In 1962, Ly Tong finished middle school, and in 1963 he studied at Huế National School.

Military career

In 1965, at the age of 19, he joined the Republic of Vietnam Air Force. From January 1965 to December 1965, Tong studied at the Air Force Training Center in Nha Trang. While at Nha Trang, he received a notice to study in the United States. In January 1970, he was assigned to the "Black Eagle" Fighter Squadron of 4th Air Force Division, at the city of Cần Thơ, where he trained to fly the Cessna U-17 and A-37 Dragonfly. During this time, Ly Tong fought mainly in the Cambodian campaign and in battles at the southwestern region of Vietnam.

In early 1973, Ly Tong was transferred to the 548 Squadron in Phan Rang. During this period, he continued his training to fly A-37 
in bombing, reconnaissance, guided air strikes and scouting missions. He mainly fought in the battlefield at the Central Highlands.

Prisoner and subsequent escape
In April 1975, while flying an attack mission against North Vietnamese targets, his A-37 was shot down by anti-aircraft fire. On the same month, the city of Saigon was captured by the North Vietnamese Army, which marked the end of the Vietnam War and the fall of South Vietnam.

After being captured, he was held in a re-education camp for five years. In August 1980, while renovating at a re-education camp in Tuy Hoa, he fled to Ho Chi Minh City where he lived illegally. During this time, Ly Tong met with people who specialized in living by making forged documents. With fake identity documents, he fled Vietnam by crossing the border by land to Cambodia and subsequently arriving in Thailand by bike, bus, train and on foot. He eventually swam at night across the Johor Strait to Singapore, hailed a cab and arrived at the United States Embassy in Singapore to request political asylum.

In 1984, Ly was granted asylum to the United States and he received a letter from then President Ronald Reagan for his struggle to attain freedom from captivity in Vietnam. He earned a master's degree in political science at the University of New Orleans and has written a novel in Vietnamese. He became good friends with former Republic of Vietnam Air Force Colonel An Vo. He also played a large role in the Vietnamese community in New Orleans.

Anti-communist activism 
In the 1990s he decided to take up anti-communist activities, and in 1992, he hijacked a Vietnam Airlines airliner. Ly Tong's copilot claimed that he was forced to fly over Ho Chi Minh City so that Ly Tong could drop thousands of leaflets calling for insurrection against the communist government of Vietnam. He parachuted and jumped from the plane, but he landed in a swamp and was apprehended by Vietnamese soldiers and sentenced to 20 years' imprisonment. In 1998 the Vietnamese government released him as part of an amnesty program along with other democracy activists. Colonel An Vo from New Orleans is said to have gone back to help him become free.

On January 1, 2000, he flew over Havana, Cuba, and dropped leaflets encouraging the Cuban people to rise up and revolt against the government of Fidel Castro. On his return to Kendall-Tamiami Executive Airport in Florida, he was detained and questioned by U.S. Immigration and Customs Enforcement but was released without charges. The Federal Aviation Administration suspended his pilots' license. On his return to Florida, he was hailed a hero by some Cuban-Americans and there was a return parade for his flight over Cuba.

On November 17, 2000, Ly Tong and a copilot flew to Thailand, from where he flew to drop 50,000 pamphlets calling for armed demonstrations against the communist government of Vietnam over Ho Chi Minh City. The leaflet-dropping coincided with a visit to Vietnam by then-U.S. President Bill Clinton. After landing, he was arrested by Thai authorities. In December 2004, the Vietnamese government sent an extradition request to Thailand, accusing Tong of slandering the Government of Vietnam and violating the territorial security of Vietnam. The Thai lower court did not consider the slander charge, deeming it a political offense, but ruled there was sufficient reason to extradite Tong. In 2006, Tong was released by the Thai government and returned to the United States. The decision to extradite Tong to Vietnam was overturned by Thai appeals court after it ruled that Tong's act was a political offense, rather than a criminal one.

On August 26, 2008, Ly Tong rented a plane and pilot for travel. But a short time after taking off, Tong told the pilot to fly the airplane over North Korea so that he could spread anti-communist leaflets to the North Koreans. The pilot told him that due to the lack of fuel they had to return to Seoul to refill, whilst sending an emergency hijacking signal to the airport authorities.  Upon landing, Tong was arrested and briefly detained by the airport authorities.

He was arrested again in July 2010 for a pepper spray assault on Vietnamese singer Dam Vinh Hung at a concert in Santa Clara, California. This singer was supposedly a singer supporting Vietnam and its communist values. This concert took place in California where many Vietnamese object to the communist values they escaped from. Security was tight, as people figured there would be an assault against the singer. Ly Tong dressed up in drag to escape security and pepper spray the singer in the face as he was being handed a flower on stage. He was convicted of two misdemeanors—simple assault and resisting arrest—and two felonies, including using tear gas and second-degree burglary with the intent to commit a felony. On June 22, 2012, he was sentenced to 6 months in jail and 3 years probation.

Later life and death 
In February through March 2008, he conducted a hunger strike at San Jose City Hall, protesting efforts by city councilwoman Madison Nguyen to name a district of the city "New Saigon Business District" instead of "Little Saigon".

Tong died of lung cancer on April 5, 2019, at Sharp Memorial Hospital, in San Diego, California. His funeral was attended by mourners within the Vietnamese American community in Westminster, California. He is buried at the Westminster Memorial Park.

References

External links
Official Facebook page Ly Tong
Vietnamese Embassy bomber claims he is "for freedom and human rights"
An old soldier still fights Vietnam War
Vietnam welcomes Thai ruling to extradite US anti-communist 
Viet Nam hails Thailand’s decision to extradite Ly Tong
Vietnam dissident wins reprieve
The Last Action Hero
Anti-communist leaves paper trail The Seattle Times
Do Not Bring Communists to the Vietnamese American Community
San Jose: Despite pleas for leniency, judge sentences activist Ly Tong to jail

1946 births
2019 deaths
South Vietnam Air Force personnel
Hijackers
Vietnamese people of the Vietnam War
American civil rights activists
Vietnamese emigrants to the United States
Vietnamese anti-communists
Shot-down aviators
Vietnamese democracy activists
Victims of aviation accidents or incidents in Vietnam
People from New Orleans
University of New Orleans alumni
Prisoners and detainees of Vietnam
American people imprisoned abroad
21st-century American criminals
Hunger strikers
Politics of San Jose, California
Deaths from lung cancer in California
People from Thừa Thiên-Huế province
Prisoners and detainees of Thailand